Evanston Gardens is an outer northern suburb of Adelaide, South Australia. It is located in the Town of Gawler.

Geography
The suburb lies astride Angle Vale Road and is bounded on the east by the Sturt Highway (Gawler Bypass).

Demographics
The 2006 Census by the Australian Bureau of Statistics counted 770 persons in Evanston Gardens on census night. Of these, 50.6% were male and 49.4% were female.

The majority of residents (78.3%) are of Australian birth, with an additional 8.4% identifying England as their country of birth.

The age distribution of Evanston Gardens residents is similar to that of the greater Australian population. 62.6% of residents were over 25 years in 2006, compared to the Australian average of 66.5%; and 37.4% were younger than 25 years, compared to the Australian average of 33.5%.

Community
Local newspapers include the News Review Messenger and The Bunyip. Other regional and national newspapers such as The Plains Producer, The Advertiser and The Australian are also available.

Schools

Evanston Gardens Primary School is located on Angle Vale Road.

Facilities and attractions

Parks
Karbeethon Reserve lies on Angle Vale Road. There are parks elsewhere in the suburb, particularly on Hindmarsh Boulevard.

Transportation

Roads
Evanston Gardens is serviced by Angle Vale Road, indirectly connecting the suburb to both Port Wakefield Road and the Sturt Highway.

Public transport
Evanston Gardens is serviced by public transport run by the Adelaide Metro.

Trains
The Gawler railway line passes through the suburb. The closest station is Tambelin.

See also
List of Adelaide suburbs

References

External links

Suburbs of Adelaide